Witsarut Himmarat, or also known by his nickname Most (Thai: โมสต์), is Thai actor for the Broadcast Thai Television Company or also known as Channel 3. He was best known for his role as Joi in Bupphesanniwat.

Personal life
Witsarut was born on 6 January 1993 at Udontani Hospital. He is a native of Nong Khai. He is the second child of four, and he has two brothers and a sister. Witsarut graduated from the Faculty of Fine Arts from Srinakharinwirot University. Witsarut began his acting career on the Nong Mai Rai Borisut in 2012, his role was Phupha, with the Channel 3.

Filmography

Drama

Series

Sitcom

Stage Play

References

External links 

 

Witsarut Himmarat
Witsarut Himmarat
Witsarut Himmarat
Living people
1993 births